Louis-Marie Désiré-Lucas (15 October 1869, Fort-de-France, Martinique – 29 September 1949, Douarnenez) was a French painter.

1869 births
1949 deaths
People from Fort-de-France
19th-century French painters
French male painters
20th-century French painters
20th-century French male artists
19th-century French male artists